Dorfer is a surname. Notable people with the surname include:

 Alfred Dorfer (born 1961), Austrian comedian, writer and actor
 Bruno Dorfer, deserter of the German Kriegsmarine during World War II
 Franz Dorfer (1950–2012), Austrian boxer

See also
 Kristina Dörfer (born 1984), German singer and television actress
 Fabian Dörfler (born 1983), German slalom canoeist